Ronald Leckie Stevenson (26 November 1938 – 3 September 1999) was a Scottish first-class cricketer.

While serving in the British Army, Stevenson played first-class cricket for the Combined Services cricket team, making two appearances in 1962, against Cambridge University at Fenner's and Ireland at Belfast. He took three first-class wickets with his right-arm off break, with all three wickets coming in the match against Cambridge University. He had previously played minor counties cricket for Bedfordshire, debuting in the 1959 Minor Counties Championship against Lincolnshire. He played just four minor counties matches for Bedfordshire, playing two matches in 1959 and two matches in 1962.

He died in November 1999 at Little Paxton, Cambridgeshire.

References

External links

1938 births
1999 deaths
Sportspeople from Ayr
Scottish cricketers
Combined Services cricketers
Bedfordshire cricketers